The Goubau family was an important noble family of Antwerp, many of its members are related to other important families.

In 1633 king Felipe IV of Spain granted nobility. In 1866 the last member of the family died.

The family had many important residences amongst them den Wolsack (1593) in Antwerp and Cortewalle Castle in Beveren. In Mespelare and Dendermonde they did important gift to the local church and founded the so-called Spaans hof in 1643 to Honour Aldegondis van Maubeuge. In Mortsel they resided in Ten Dorpe Castle

Members
 Henri Goubau, knight of Calatrava.
 Joannes I Goubau, Lord of Saint-Fontaine, (1503-1581): marr. Joanne Cossiers in 1534, daughter of Joannes Cossiers or Cosserie and Barbe Schetz.
 Joannes II Goubau, marr. Joanna Stayaerts.
 Henricus Goubau 
 Jacobus Goubau, marr. Catharine Maynaert.
 Joanna Goubau, died 1575.
 Gaspar Goubau 
 Antonius Goubau 
 Alexander I Goubau, (1540-1614): Grand Aumonier of Antwerp, buried in the cathedral.
 Anna Goubau, (1568-)
 Alexander II Goubau (1571-)
 Maria Goubau, (1573-)
 Joannes III Goubau, Lord of Ghysegem, (1575-1645): Grand Aumonier of Antwerp, Knighted in 1633. Marr. Magd. Vecquemans.
 Alexander III Goubau, Lord of Ghysegem, (1598-1668), knighted 1648, Mayor of Antwerp, Grand Aumonier of Antwerp, 1629. marr. Anna Doncker.
 Joannes IV Goubau, Lord of Ghysegem, (1630-) : knighted 1655, marr Marie Cornelie crook.
 Alexander IV Goubau, Lord of Mespelaere, (1658-1712): Grand Aumonier of Antwerp, Marr. in 1690 Maria Catharina Rubens, granddaughter of Nicolaas Rubens, Lord of Rameyen.
 Georges Alexander Goubau, Lord of Mespelaere (1697-1760) : marr. Maria Bosschaert.
 Joannes V Cornelis Goubau, (1660-1702), Grand Aumonier of Antwerp in 1689: marr. Susanne van Colen.
 François Goubau, Lord of Triest, (1611-1647) : marr. Isabella vanden Broecke.
 Joannes VI Frans Goubau, Lord of Triest, (1646-1683), Lord of Beveren, knighted on 10 April 1679 by Charles II: Marr. Margaretha-Catharina Gerardi.
 Peter Frans Goubau, (1680-1749): marr. Maria Lucretia Bernaerts.
 Charles Henri Goubau, (1708-1776): councillor of the Great Council of Mechelen, marr. Regina de Villegas (1722-1794 .
 Melchior Joseph François Ghislain Goubau, (1757-1836): councillor of the Great Council of Mechelen, marr. Marie-Jeanne de Villegas de Pellenberg.
 Emmanuel Goubau, (1760-1828), marr. Maria Isabella de Brouchoven de Bergeyck (1773-1819).
 Eugène Joseph Goubau, (1761-1831): Lord mayor of the Brugse Vrije.

Family tree

References

Belgian noble families
Mayors of Antwerp, Belgium
Roman Catholic families
Nobility of the Spanish Netherlands
Lists of Belgian nobility